Elections to Macclesfield Borough Council in England were held on 3 May 2007. One third of the council was up for election and the Conservative Party kept overall control of the council with a majority of 16 seats.  Overall turnout was 35.9%.

After the election, the composition of the council was
Conservative 38
Liberal Democrat 12
Labour 6
Handforth Ratepayers 2
Independents 2

Results

Ward results

References
Macclesfield Borough Council election results
Manchester Evening News, election results
Macclesfield Express, local elections 2007

2007
2007 English local elections
2000s in Cheshire